There are several species names which are called "triangulum"; "triangulum" is Latin referring to triangles

 Chaetodon triangulum (C. triangulum), the triangle butterflyfish, a species of fish
 Dendropsophus triangulum (D. triangulum), the triangle treefrog, a species of frog
 Eumorpha triangulum (E. triangulum), a species of moth
 Lampropeltis triangulum (L. triangulum), the milk snake, a species of snake
 Lampropeltis triangulum triangulum (L. t. triangulum), the eastern milk snake, a subspecies of snake
 Lambula triangulum (L. triangulum), a species of moth
 Noctua triangulum (N. triangulum), a species of moth
 Philanthus triangulum (P. triangulum), the European beewolf, a species of wasp
 Polygonum triangulum (P. triangulum), the bushy knotweed, a species of buckwheat
 Xestia triangulum (X. triangulum), the double square spot, a species of moth

Taxonomic lists